Cyme euprepioides is a species of moth of the family Erebidae. It is found on Borneo, Sumatra, Peninsular Malaysia and in the north-eastern Himalayas and the Philippines. The habitat consists of various lowland forest types.

References

Nudariina
Moths of Asia
Moths described in 1862